The blanket flower moth (Schinia masoni) is a moth of the family Noctuidae. It is found in North America, including Colorado and Wyoming.

The wingspan is about 22 mm.

The larvae feed on Gaillardia aristata.

External links
Image

Schinia
Moths of North America
Moths described in 1896